College of Dairy Science and Food Technology, Raipur is a constituent college of Chhattisgarh Kamdhenu Vishwavidyalaya. It was established in 1983 under the jurisdiction of Jawaharlal Nehru Krishi Vishwa Vidyalaya, Jabalpur. The College is the only Institute of its kind in Chhattisgarh. This college is spread in area of approximately 12 acres.

History
College of Dairy Science and Food Technology, Raipur was established in 1983 under the jurisdiction of Jawaharlal Nehru Krishi Vishwa Vidyalaya, Jabalpur. In 1987, college was transferred under Indira Gandhi Krishi Vishwavidyalaya, Raipur. In the year 1989, Government of Madhya Pradesh Dairy Plant situated in Raipur was handed over to Indira Gandhi Krishi Vishwavidyalaya for establishment of this College. Since 2012, it is a constituent college of Chhattisgarh Kamdhenu Vishwavidyalaya.

Departments
Department of Dairy Technology
Department of Dairy Engineering
Department of Dairy Microbiology
Department of Dairy Chemistry
Department of Dairy Business Management
Department of Food Technology

Academics
The institute offers B.Tech, M.Tech and Ph.D in Dairy Science and Food Technology.

References

Educational institutions established in 1983
1983 establishments in Madhya Pradesh
Dairy farming in India
Universities and colleges in Chhattisgarh
Education in Raipur, Chhattisgarh